The 2019–20 Nemzeti Bajnokság II (also known as 2019–20 Merkantil Bank Liga) is Hungary's 69th season of the Nemzeti Bajnokság II, the second tier of the Hungarian football league system.
On 29 July 2019, it was announced that Balmazújváros did not receive license from the Hungarian Football Federation. On 29 August 2019 it was confirmed that Balmazújváros's license was suspended. Therefore, the 2019-20 Nemzeti Bajnokság would continue with 19 teams only.

On 4 May 2020 season was suspended due to the COVID-19 pandemic.

Team changes

Stadiums by capacity

Stadiums by locations

Personnel and kits

League table

Notes
 Note 1: suspended

Position by round

See also
 2019–20 Magyar Kupa
 2019–20 Nemzeti Bajnokság I
 2019–20 Nemzeti Bajnokság III

References

External links
  
  

Nemzeti Bajnokság II seasons
2019–20 in Hungarian football
Hun